Nationality words link to articles with information on the nation's poetry or literature (for instance, Irish or France).

Events
 February – Founding of the Poetry Recital Society, later the Poetry Society, in London.
 July 1 – English poets F. M. Cornford and Frances Darwin marry.
 T. E. Hulme leaves the Poets' Club, and starts meeting with F. S. Flint and other poets in a new group which Hulme referred to as the 'Secession Club'; they meet at the Eiffel Tower restaurant in London's Soho district to discuss plans to reform contemporary poetry through the introduction of free verse, tanka and haiku, and the removal of all unnecessary verbiage from poems. In April, Ezra Pound is introduced to the group and joins it.

Works published in English

Canada
 May Austin Low, Confession, and Other Verses.
 Tom MacInnes, Lonesome Bar and Other Poems (much of the book was reprinted in In Amber Lands 1910)
 Robert W. Service, Ballads of a Cheechako
 E. W. Thomson, The Many-Mansioned House and Other Poems

United Kingdom
 Laurence Binyon, England, and Other Poems
 A. C. Bradley, Oxford Lectures on Poetry, criticism
 Joseph Campbell, The Mountainy Singer
 Roby Datta, Echoes from the East and West to which are added stray notes of Mine Own, edited by Roby Datta, Cambridge: Galloway and Porter, Indian poet, writing in English, published in the United Kingdom
 John Davidson, Fleet Street, and Other Poems
 Thomas Hardy, Time's Laughingstocks, and Other Verses
 George Meredith, Last Poems
 Alfred Noyes, The Enchanted Island, and Other Poems
 Ezra Pound, American poet published in the United Kingdom:
 Personae
 Exultations
 The Poets' Club publishes two anthologies: For Christmas MDCCCCVIII (January 1909) and The Book of the Poets' Club (December) including the first examples of Imagist poetry
 James Stephens, Insurrections, Irish poet published in the United Kingdom
 John Millington Synge, Poems and Translations, preface by W. B. Yeats, Irish poet published in the United Kingdom

United States
 Ambrose Bierce, Collected Works, including poetry, published in 12 volumes from this year to 1912
 Florence Earle Coates, Lyrics of Life
 Francis M. Finch, The Blue and the Gray and other verses, published posthumously (the author died in 1907), with an introduction by Andrew Dickson White, "and a portrait of the author"; New York: Henry Holt and Company
 Louise Imogen Guiney, Happy Ending
 James Oppenheim, Monday Morning
 Ezra Pound, American poet published in the United Kingdom:
 Personae
 Exultations
 Lizette Woodworth Reese, A Wayside Lute
 Robert Service, Ballads of a Cheechako
 George Sterling, A Wine of Wizardry
 William Carlos Williams, Poems

Other in English
 James Stephens, Insurrections, Irish poet published in the United Kingdom
 John Millington Synge, Poems and Translations, preface by W. B. Yeats, Irish poet published in the United Kingdom

Works published in other languages

India
 Kerala Varma Valiya Koil Thampuran, ' 'Deiva Yogam' ', a short narrative poem, India,  Malayalam-language

Telugu language
 Chellapilla Venkata Sastry and  Divakarla Tirupati Sastry:
Panigrihita
Sravananandam
 Chilakamarti Lakshminarasimham, Gayopakhyanam, verse drama about the mythological Gaya, devotee of Lord Krishna
 Rayaprolu Subba Rao, Lalitha

Other
 Jean Cocteau, La Lampe d'Aladin, published when the author was 20 years old; France
 Ernst Enno, Uued luuletused, Estonia
 René Maran, La Maison du Bonheur, Guyanese poet writing in French
 Yone Noguchi, The Pilgrimage, Japan

Births
Death years link to the corresponding "[year] in poetry" article:
 January 28 – Beatrice Deloitte Davis (died 1992), Australian book editor and poet
 February 14 – A. M. Klein (died 1972) Ukrainian-born Canadian poet, essayist and author of short stories
 February 28 – Stephen Spender (died 1995), English poet, novelist and essayist who concentrated on themes of social injustice and the class struggle
 March 6 – Vagaland, pen name of Thomas Alexander Robertson (died 1973), Shetland Scottish poet
 March 9 – Elder Olson (died 1992), American poet, teacher and literary critic
 April 24 – Robert Farren (Roibeárd Ó Faracháin) (died 1984), Irish poet
 May 1 – Yannis Ritsos (died 1990), Greek poet
 May 9 – Robert Garioch (died 1981), Scots-language poet, translator, and key member in the literary revival of the language in the mid-20th century
 May 28 – Randall Swingler (died 1967), English poet, librettist, publisher and flautist
 May 30 – Edappally Raghavan Pillai (died 1936), Indian, Malayalam-language poet
 July 4 – Lynette Roberts (died 1995), Argentine-born Welsh poet
 July 18 – Bishnu Dey (died 1982), Bengali poet, prose writer and movie critic
 July 19 – Balamani Amma, Indian, Malayalam-language poet, a woman
 July 27 – Charles Brasch (died 1973), New Zealand poet, literary editor, arts patron and founding editor of the literary journal Landfall
 Augusxt 1 – W. R. Rodgers (died 1969), Irish poet, essayist, book reviewer, radio broadcaster, script writer, lecturer, teacher and Presbyterian minister
 October 4 – P. Kunhiraman Nair (died 1978), Indian, Malayalam-language poet
 October 12 – Dorothy Livesay (died 1996), Canadian poet
 November 16 – Michio Mado, Japanese poet who worked for the Office of the Governor-General of Taiwan
 December 15 – John Glassco (died 1981) Canadian poet, memoirist, novelist and pornographer

Deaths
 January 22 – Nabinchandra Sen (born 1847), Bengali poet and writer
 March 23 – John Davidson  (born 1857), Scottish poet and playwright
 March 24 – John Millington Synge (born 1871), Irish playwright, poet, prose writer and collector of folklore
 April 10 – Algernon Charles Swinburne (born 1837), English poet
 May 4 – Helen Marr Hurd (born 1839), American poet and teacher
 May 18 – George Meredith (born 1828), English novelist and poet
 June 24 – Sarah Orne Jewett (born 1849), American novelist, short story writer and poet
 July 26 – William Reed Huntington (born 1838), American Episcopal priest, author and poet
 August 21 – George Cabot Lodge (born 1873), American
 October 16 – Jakub Bart-Ćišinski (born 1856), Sorbian poet, writer, playwright and translator
 November 10 – George Essex Evans (born 1863), Australian
 November 18 – Renée Vivien (born 1877), English-born French-language Symbolist poet
 November 19
 Richard Watson Gilder (born 1844), American poet and editor
 John B. Tabb (born 1845), American poet, Catholic priest and scholar
 November 28 – W. T. Goodge (born 1862), Australian
 November 30 – Romesh Chundar Dutt (born 1848), writer of Indian poetry in English; cousin of Toru Dutt

Awards and honors
 Newdigate Prize (University of Oxford) – Frank Ashton-Gwatkin, "Michelangelo"

See also

 20th century in poetry
 20th century in literature
 French literature of the 20th century
 List of years in literature
 List of years in poetry
 Silver Age of Russian Poetry
 Young Poland (Młoda Polska) a modernist period in Polish  arts and literature, roughly from 1890 to 1918

Notes

Poetry
20th-century poetry